Meaning "little devil", the diawl bach is a popular  Welsh fly pattern used in British still waters, and an appropriate lure to use when the fish are feeding on midge pupae.  The dressing is simple: size 8 to 14 hook, brown thread, a few barbs of brown hackle for the tail, copper wire, a few barbs of peacock herl for the body, and tying thread for the head.

Variations
Variations include jungle cock substitute cheeks, red head, hare's ear for the body and flash materials on the back.

Fishing approach
Fish as one of a team of three flies drawn slowly on a dry line with a long leader.  A particularly effective method is to let the wind push the floating fly line around and look for a twitch in the line as indication that a fish has taken the fly.  It can be effective during a midge (chironomid) hatch, and a flashy version is worth using towards the autumn as a pinfry imitator.

References 

Artificial flies